A list of films produced in Egypt in 1984. For an A-Z list of films currently on Wikipedia, see :Category:Egyptian films.

External links
 Egyptian films of 1984 at the Internet Movie Database
 Egyptian films of 1984 elCinema.com

Lists of Egyptian films by year
1984 in Egypt
Lists of 1984 films by country or language